is a district in north-central Kushiro Subprefecture, Hokkaido, Japan.

Towns 
Shibecha
Teshikaga

Districts in Hokkaido